Thomas Cullen (1939 – 5 October  2020) was an Irish Gaelic footballer. At club level he had some success with Edenderry and was a two-time Leinster Championship winner with the Offaly senior football team.

Playing career

Cullen played club football with Edenderry. He began his inter-county career as a dual player with the Offaly minor teams that contested provincial finals in both hurling and Gaelic football in 1957. He was called up to the Offaly senior football panel during the 1957-58 National League and made his championship debut in the 1958 Leinster Championship. Cullen played a role in the Offaly breakthrough, claiming back-to-back Leinster Championships in the 1960 championship and 1961 competition before losing out to Down in the 1961 All-Ireland final. He continued to line out for Offaly until June 1968 and in total he represented the team on 58 occasions, 23 times in the championship and 35 times in the league. At club level, Cullen won an Offaly County Championship with Edenderry while still a minor, while he also played a role in the club's rise to the senior ranks of Offaly hurling as they captured the junior championship in 1962 and the intermediate championship in 1963.

Honours

Edenderry
Offaly Senior Football Championship (1): 1957
Offaly Intermediate Hurling Championship (1): 1963
Offaly Junior Hurling Championship (1): 1962

Offaly
Leinster Senior Football Championship (2): 1960, 1961

References

1939 births
2020 deaths
Edenderry Gaelic footballers
Edenderry hurlers
Offaly inter-county Gaelic footballers
Offaly inter-county hurlers
Gaelic football selectors